Navicula elegans is a marine and freshwater species of algae of the genus of Navicula.

References

Further reading
 
 

elegans
Species described in 1853